In the 2013–14 season, Rotherham United competed in League One, after a late surge in the closing stages of League Two (resulting in them being the first team to win five consecutive matches that season), saw them finishing second, behind Gillingham, and ahead of Port Vale - whom spent all season in the top two. The club also took part in the annual Capital One Cup and FA Cup, and spent another season in the lower tier tournament, the Johnstones Paint Trophy. United commenced the season under the retained management of Steve Evans, alongside assistant Paul Raynor. They went into the season as decent favourites for promotion, as well as contenders for the Johnstones Paint Trophy.

Due to the promotion, Rotherham were playing against South Yorkshire rivals Sheffield United, whom hadn't played against each other in the league for years. One other local team to join Rotherham in League One was Bradford City, who were beaten twice last season by the Millers - one being a 4–0 thrashing at the New York Stadium. Another notable fixture that took place was a home tie in the first round of the Capital One Cup against South Yorkshire rivals Sheffield Wednesday, whom they famously beat 2–1.

Also, prior to the start of the season, the club continued to show its fulfilment to huge bonds with the community, collecting the 2013 Family Excellence Award.

The captain for the season was Welsh defender Craig Morgan, who wore the number 20 shirt for the Millers.

During this season they collected 86 points scoring 86 goals (the 2nd highest of any League 1 team) while conceding 58 goals (joint 9th best. They came fourth in the league and subsequently featured in the League 1 playoffs. They beat Preston in the Playoffs semi finals 4–2 on aggregate and faced Leyton Orient in the final. After 90 minutes it was 2–2 and it went to penalties. Rotherham had gone behind 2–1 on penalties but came back to win 4–3 on penalties to gain promotion to the Championship. They featured in the 2014–15 Football League Championship next season.

Squad statistics

Current squad

 (on loan from Bolton Wanderers)

 (on loan from Newcastle United)

 (on loan from Queens Park Rangers)

Appearances and Goals

(starts) + (substitute apps)

Goalscorers

Pre–season

Competitions

League One
On 19 June 2013, the fixtures for the forthcoming season were announced.

League table

Results summary

Matchday summary

Fixtures

Play-offs

Football League Cup

Football League Trophy

FA Cup

Transfers

References

2013-14
2013–14 Football League One by team